KTRC (1260 AM) is a commercial radio station broadcasting a progressive talk radio format. It is licensed to Santa Fe, New Mexico, and is owned by Hutton Broadcasting, LLC.  Its studios and transmitter are located in Santa Fe.

By day, KTRC is powered at 5,000 watts.  But to protect other stations on 1310 AM at night, KTRC reduces power to 1,000 watts at sunset.  Programming is also heard on 250 watt FM translator K279CX at 103.7 MHz.

Programming
Weekdays
This Morning, America's First News with Gordon Deal (4am-7am)
Stephanie Miller (7am-10am)
Thom Hartmann (10am-1pm)
Richard Eeds (local) (1pm-4pm)
Rick Unger (4pm-6pm)
Randi Rhodes (6pm-8pm)
Thom Hartmann (repeat) (8pm-11pm)
Coast to Coast AM with George Noory (11pm-4am)

Weekends
Ring of Fire
Kim Komando
Hometown Project
All Things Real Estate

History
The station went on the air as KVSF on February 14, 1992. On July 23, 2002, the station changed its call sign to the current KTRC.

The station was purchased by American General Media in 2000 from Withers Broadcasting Co. in a $7 million deal that included KVSF 1400 AM, KQBA 107.5 FM, KLBU 94.7 FM and KVCN 106.7 FM. KTRC was acquired by Hutton Broadcasting in 2008. All these stations except 106.7 were eventually acquired by Hutton.

Hutton Broadcasting had a construction permit to move translator K235CO from Socorro to Santa Fe to broadcast this station on the FM band at 103.7. The translator was licensed for the new facility as K279CX effective February 21, 2018.

References

External links

TRC
Radio stations established in 1992
Progressive talk radio